The Tobin Bridges are two bridges for highway and railroad crossings of the North Fork Feather River that nearly cross at the west side of the river.  The railroad bridge also crosses over Highway 70.

The railroad Tobin Bridge is located on the Union Pacific Railroad's (originally Western Pacific Railroad's) Feather River Route through the Sierra Nevada in northeastern California, connecting the Sacramento Valley to Salt Lake City via the Feather River valley. The bridge is part of WP's eastward climb to its summit at Beckwourth Pass while maintaining the railroad's overall 1.0 percent (compensated) grade, the least steep of any mountain grade on a transcontinental railroad.

Railfanning
The Tobin Bridges are an extended part of Plumas County's "7 Wonders of the Railroad World" and access is described in its travel guide.

See also
List of bridges documented by the Historic American Engineering Record in California

References

External links

Bridges in Plumas County, California
Historic American Engineering Record in California
Union Pacific Railroad bridges
Western Pacific Railroad